L'Enseigne de Gersaint is an oil on canvas painting in the Charlottenburg Palace in Berlin, by French painter Jean-Antoine Watteau. Completed during 1720–21, it is considered to be the last prominent work of Watteau, who died some time after. It was painted as a shop sign for the marchand-mercier, or art dealer, Edme François Gersaint. According to Daniel Roche the sign functioned more as an advertisement for the artist than the dealer. 

The painting exaggerates the size of Gersaint's cramped boutique, hardly more than a permanent booth with a little backshop, on the medieval Pont Notre-Dame, in the heart of Paris, both creating and following fashion as he purveyed works of art and luxurious trifles to an aristocratic clientele.

Content

The picture was originally painted on one canvas, depicting clients and staff at the shop. As a worker packs away a portrait of Louis XIV at the left, in the centre a young man offers his hand to a woman who is stepping over the threshold of the shop. At the right an elderly couple examine a painting of nudes, and a pretty young shop assistant, possibly Gersaint's wife, shows a painting to a group of well-dressed young people. In its present form, the painting consists of two separate parts, the upper sections of them were added between 1720 and 1732 by an unknown painter to transform the painting from its original, arched shape into a rectangular field. Watteau probably painted the work in the spring of 1720 when the entire entrance facade of Gersaint's shop was rebuilt. According to the study by Vogtherr and Wenders de Calisse (2007) the painting had originally covered the round field above the entrance of the shop. These changes to the building were made in the spring of 1720, the most likely date for the painting.

The artworks in the painting are set alongside the actions of high-society criticism. The young man offering his hand to the woman in pink is set against a series of female nudes, while puritanical figures in portraits at the left seem to look down disapprovingly. At the right, there are numerous images of orgies and naked figures, implying that art expresses the hidden lustful feelings of the genteel figures in the shop, who merely gaze at one another or engage in polite gestures of intimacy.

Commonly, the painting is interpreted as a commentary on the shift in aristocratic culture – or relief – that occurred during the government of the more licentious Régent Philippe II, Duke of Orléans (1715–1723), after the death of Louis XIV and before the accession to the throne of Louis XV. The boxing of Pierre Mignard's portrait of the deceased king implies the end of the old régime.

Provenance
The painting never actually functioned as an external shop sign, spending only fifteen days at the shop. Watteau himself asked Gersaint to allow him to paint it, complaining of "cold fingers" that needed some exercise. It was soon bought by Claude Glucq. It was then acquired by Watteau's patron Jean de Jullienne. An engraving was made in 1732 after a small version by Pater who extended Watteau's composition for the print. It attracted the attention of Frederick the Great of Prussia. He bought the painting in 1748 (at that time already in two separate parts) from the Dutch dealer Pieter Boetgens. It remained in Germany thereafter, now forming part of the collection of the Stiftung Preußische Schlösser und Gärten Berlin-Brandenburg that display it at the Charlottenburg Palace, Berlin where it had first been displayed in 1748.

Details

References

Bibliography

 
 
 
 
 
 
 
 
 
 
 
 
 
 
 
 
 
 
 
 
 
 
 
 
 
 
 
 
 
  . Published in French as

External links

L'Enseigne de Gersaint Story and Analysis
L'Enseigne de Gersaint at the Web Gallery of Art

1720 paintings
Paintings in the collection of the Berlin State Museums
Paintings by Antoine Watteau
Paintings in Schloss Charlottenburg
Paintings of art galleries